Leia is a genus of fungus gnats in the family Mycetophilidae. There are more than 170 described species in Leia.

See also
 List of Leia species

References

External links

 Diptera.info
 NCBI Taxonomy Browser, Leia

Mycetophilidae
Bibionomorpha genera